Nottingham Central by-election may refer to one of two parliamentary by-elections held for the former British House of Commons constituency of Nottingham Central:

 1930 Nottingham Central by-election
 1940 Nottingham Central by-election

See also
 Nottingham Central (UK Parliament constituency)
 List of United Kingdom by-elections